Mattias Olsson (born 9 January 1975) started his career as a classical percussionist playing in orchestras and big bands on Ekerö outside of Stockholm. As a sideline to recording and producing bands Mattias Olsson writes articles (music-related) for several Swedish magazines.

Early life
He was born in Hong Kong to Swedish parents. In 1981 he moved to Stockholm. Starting as a drummer at eight years old he started off playing in big bands, pop and classical ensembles.

Career
When he was 17 he joined progressive rock band Änglagård. Änglagård consisted of musicians from Ekerö as well as Waxholm. The band was heavily influenced by bands such as King Crimson, Yes and Genesis but also listened to less famous bands such as Shylock, Cathedral and Yezda Urfa. Änglagård quickly became known for their instrumentation skills and their dynamic range often reminiscent of classical music. When the band started the current trend in progressive rock was to use the newest digital equipment. Änglagård decided instead to use old classic prog equipment like the Rickenbacker bass, Minimoog and the Mellotron. Änglagård recorded two studio albums in the 1990s, Hybris (1992) and Epilog (1994). They also recorded a live album called Buried Alive (1996). The title was a joke from Mattias, the worst title for a live album must be ...Buried Alive.  After a long hiatus, the band released their third album Viljans Öga in 2012.

He also did some sessions with White Willow and Pär Lindh.

After Änglagård, he joined Swedish pop band Pineforest Crunch who have so far recorded three albums: Make Believe, Watergarden and Panamarenko. The band's influences ranged from R.E.M, American Music Club to King Crimson and the Sundays. Pineforest Crunch had a very strong D.I.Y ethos and recorded six demos before getting signed to Abbas' old label Polar. The band had a hit from the first album, "Cup Noodle Song". The single was a hit in Sweden and Japan and led to intensive touring. The second album, Watergarden, was recorded in England with Radiohead producer Jim Warren. Watergarden mixed orchestral textures with Mellotrons and experimental guitars. Parallel with Pineforest Crunch, he started playing drums and occasional keyboards with Reminder.

He has since then played in numerous projects and is now active as a record producer. He has recorded albums with Deadwood Forest, Devi, Clockwork, AK-Momo, Nanook of the North, Vijaya and others.

Theatre and film

Together with musician and composer Matti Bye, Mattias Olsson has written music for both film and theatre. In 2009 they wrote music for productions at both Dramaten and Stadsteatern in Stockholm. They have also played together at silent movie festivals and showings both in Tromsø and Stockholm. They have written and played music for Berlin, Nanook of the North and Fritz Langs Metropolis.

Studio
Mattias Olsson runs his own studio outside of Stockholm called Roth Händle Studio. The studio started as a simple home studio using an Akai Dps-12 and a handful microphones. There was no plan to become a producer but as bookings started to appear albums started getting recorded. The small home studio is where the Swedish pop band Andreas & Jag started recording three albums. Andreas & Jag was Mattias Olsson and Andreas Morland. Other bands that recorded at the home studio are Pineforest Crunch and Nanook of the North. The first real location was at Finnboda Varv just outside Stockholm. At this studio location bands like Kit le fever and Clockwork recorded early EPs. The Studio has a collection of musical artifacts including claviolines, pipe organs, Stylophones, Mellotrons, Celesta, Orchestrons and Talentmakers.

In 2010 the location in Sundbyberg closed and the studio went into storage for a brief while before being relocated to Sollentuna.

Personal life
Mattias Olsson is married to Åsa Carild and has three children.

Film Scores

Lapporten
Blått Blod
När världen kom till Ronneby
Lollipop

Selected discography

 The Winter Tree - Earth Below
 Andreas & Jag – The Uri Geller Syndrome
 Andreas & Jag – Everyone Loves You
 Andreas & Jag – Aretha Live in Pakistan
 Anima Morte – The Nightmare Becomes Reality
 Krysztof Antkowiak – Antkowiak
 Clockwork – Garden
 Gösta Berlings Saga – Detta har hänt
 Gösta Berlings Saga – Glue Works
 Ingranaggi Della Valle – In Hoc Signo
 Necromonkey – The shadow of the blind man
 Necromonkey – Necroplex
 Necromonkey – Live at Pianos (N.Y)
 Necromonkey – Show me where it Hz
 Necromonkey – A Glimpse of Possible Endings
 The Opium Cartel – Night Blooms
 Vera Vinter – Du gör mig Rädd
 The Opium Cartel – Ardor
 Vly - Vly
 Kaukasus - Kaukasus
 Pär Lindh Project – Gothic Impressions
 Pineforest Crunch – Make Believe
 Pineforest Crunch – "Cup Noodle Song" (single)
 Pineforest Crunch – Watergarden
 Pineforest Crunch – Shangri-la (Japanese version of Watergarden with bonus tracks)
 Pixie Ninja - Ultrasound
 Pixie Ninja - Colours Out Of Space  
 Reminder – Broken Tone
 Geller – "Judas" (single)
 Vijaya – Vijaya
 Two Times the Trauma – "A Little Sign" (single)
 Two Times the Trauma – I Fell in Love With an Ocean
 The Tarantula Waltz – The Tarantula Waltz
 Nanook of the North – The Täby Tapes
 Ludvig Andersson – S.R.O
 Mellodrama – OST
 Molesome – Songs for Vowels & Mammals
 Molesome - Aftonland
 Molesome - Are you there
 Molesome - Tom & Tiger
 Molesome - Be my Baby tonight
 Molesome – Dial
 AK-Momo – Return to N.Y
 Matti Bye & Mattias Olsson – Elephant & Castle
 In these Murky waters - In these murky waters
 Saint She – Ska jag berätta en hemlighet
 Tiger Olsson - Vässarö (Single)
 Tiger Olsson - Box of hearts
 Von Andersson noise system - Echoes
 Lennart Grabe - Sånger 1967 - 2017
 Kit le fever – Soldier Blue
 Rising Shadows – Finis Gloriae Mundi (2010) 
 Therion – Sitra Ahra (2010)
 Therion – Les Fleurs du Mal (2012)
 White Willow – Terminal Twilight (2011)
 White Willow - Future Hopes
 Änglagård – Hybris (1992)
 Änglagård – Epilog (1994)
 Änglagård – Buried Alive (1996)
 Änglagård – Ptolemaic Terrascope 7" Gånglåt från Knapptibble
 Änglagård – Viljans Öga (2012)
 Döskalle - Aliver at Copperfields (2019)
 The Devils staircase - The devils staircase (2020)
 Isobar - Isobar

References 
 Änglagård Interviews  (with Mattias Olsson)
 Roth Händle Studio

External links 
 [Mattias Olsson's appearances & credits on different albums] at Discogs.com

Living people
Swedish drummers
Male drummers
Swedish record producers
1975 births
21st-century drummers
21st-century Swedish male musicians